Schunk (or Schunck, Shunk) is a surname. Notable people with the surname include:

 Dale Schunk, American educational psychologist, former Dean and current professor in the School of Education at the University of North Carolina at Greensboro
 Edward Schunck (1820–1903), British chemist
 Emily Schunk (born 1998), known online as Emiru, American Twitch streamer
 Harry Shunk (1924–2006), German photographer
 Ludwig Schunk, (1884–1947), German manufacturer
 Mae A. Schunk (born 1934), 45th Lieutenant Governor of Minnesota
 Pierre Schunck (1906–1993), Dutch resistance person
 Robert Schunk (born 1948), German operatic tenor
 Ross Schunk (born 1986), American soccer player

See also
 Schunk Group
 Ludwig-Schunk-Stiftung